The seventh government of Francisco Franco was formed on 8 July 1965.

Franco's seventh cabinet was made up of members from the different factions or "families" within the National Movement: mainly the FET y de las JONS party—the only legal political party during the Francoist regime—the military, the Opus Dei and the National Catholic Association of Propagandists (ACNP), as well as a number of aligned-nonpartisan technocrats or figures from the civil service. The cabinet would see an extensive reshuffle in October 1969 as a result of internal divisions between the various factions within the Movement and the unveiling of the Matesa scandal earlier that year. During the cabinet's tenure the Organic Law of the State would be passed in 1967, regulating key aspects of the structuring and functioning of the government.

Council of Ministers
The Council of Ministers was structured into the offices for the prime minister, the deputy prime minister and 18 ministries, including two ministers without portfolio.

Departmental structure
Francisco Franco's seventh government was organised into several superior and governing units, whose number, powers and hierarchical structure varied depending on the ministerial department.

Unit/body rank
() Undersecretary
() Director-general
() Military & intelligence agency

Notes

References

Bibliography

External links
Governments. Dictatorship of Franco (18.07.1936 / 20.11.1975). CCHS–CSIC (in Spanish).
Governments of Franco. Dictatorship Chronology (1939–1975). Fuenterrebollo Portal (in Spanish).
The governments of the Civil War and Franco's dictatorship (1936–1975). Lluís Belenes i Rodríguez History Page (in Spanish).
Biographies. Royal Academy of History (in Spanish).

1965 establishments in Spain
1969 disestablishments in Spain
Cabinets established in 1965
Cabinets disestablished in 1969
Council of Ministers (Spain)